Elmer Ellsworth Leonard (November 12, 1888 – May 27, 1981), nicknamed "Tiny",  was an American Major League Baseball pitcher. He played for the Philadelphia Athletics during the  season.

References

Major League Baseball pitchers
Philadelphia Athletics players
Baseball players from California
1888 births
1981 deaths
Oakland Oaks (baseball) players
Saint Mary's Gaels baseball players
Spokane Indians players
Walla Walla Bears players
Portland Colts players
Ballard Pippins players
Portland Beavers players
People from Napa, California